The 2019 Horsham District Council election took place on 2 May 2019 to elect members of Horsham District Council in England. It was held on the same day as other local elections. Every seat was contested and the Conservatives retained control of the council with a majority of 8.

Council Composition 

Prior to the election, the composition of the council was:

After the election, the composition of the council was:

Results summary

|-

Ward results

Billingshurst

Bramber, Upper Beeding & Woodmancote

Broadbridge Heath

Colgate & Rusper

Cowfold, Shermanbury & West Grinstead

Denne

Forest

Henfield

Holbrook East

Holbrook West

Itchingfield, Slinfold & Warnham

Nuthurst & Lower Beeding

Pulborough, Coldwaltham & Amberley

Roffey North

Roffey South

Rudgwick

Southwater North

Southwater South & Shipley

Steyning & Ashurst

Storrington & Washington

Trafalgar

West Chiltington, Thakeham & Ashington

By-elections since the 2019 election

Storrington & Washington

Trafalgar
A by-election was called in Trafalgar ward due to the retirement of Leonard Crosbie on September 3, 2020. The Horsham & Crawley Liberal Democrats confirmed his death on 11 September 2020.

Forest
A by-election was called in Forest ward due to the retirement of Godfrey Newman on August 11, 2021. The by-election was held on Thursday 21 October and the seat retained by the Liberal Democrats

Roffey South
Following the death of Councillor Roy Cornell,  by-election was held on Thursday December 16. This seat was gained by the Liberal Democrats from the Conservatives.

Denne 
Following the resignation of Cllr Frances Haigh, a by-election will be held for the vacant seat of Denne in Horsham town. The election was held on Thursday 24 March 2022. Cllr Haigh was leader of the opposition Liberal Democrats until August 2021. The seat was held by Clive Trott of the Liberal Democrats.

 
 {{Election box candidate with party link|party=Labour Party (UK)

Storrington & Washington
Following the resignation of Cllr Jim Sanson, (Conservative) a by-election was held on 7 April 2022 for the vacant seat of Storrington & Washington. the election was won by the Green Party in a traditionally safe Conservative seat.

References

2019 English local elections
May 2019 events in the United Kingdom
2019
2010s in West Sussex